Jürgen Kauz (born 23 August 1974) is an Austrian football player.

References

Austrian footballers
Austria international footballers
LASK players
SK Rapid Wien players
SV Ried players
SC Rheindorf Altach players
SW Bregenz players
1974 births
Living people
Footballers from Vienna
Austrian Football Bundesliga players
Association football midfielders